Cardiodictyon is a genus of lobopodian known from 518 millions years old Chengjiang Lagerstätte. 525 millions years old partial fossil is also reported.  It has ~25 pairs of legs, each associated with a pair of dorsal plates.

Each leg terminates in a pair of claws.  It may or may not have a head shield, though it certainly has an expanded head.

In 2022, a 518 million years old specimen of C. catenulum was researched and shown an unsegmented head and a brain composed of three separate cephalic parts. However, although "three parts" in this study means prosocerebrum, protocerebrum and deutocerebrum, it is different from earlier studies that referred protocerebrum, deutocerebrum and tritocerebrum as tripartite brain of arthropod, and treated posocerebrum as part of protocerebrum.

References 

Lobopodia
Prehistoric protostome genera

Cambrian genus extinctions